Polar Adventure is a 2015 Chinese animated adventure comedy film directed by Qiao Fang. It was released on October 1, 2015.

Voice cast
Li Minyan
Li Ye
Yan Lizhen

Box office
The film has earned  at the Chinese box office.

References

External links

2010s adventure comedy films
2015 animated films
2015 films
Animated adventure films
Animated comedy films
Chinese animated films
2015 computer-animated films
2015 comedy films
2010s Mandarin-language films